Gold by The Beautiful South is the third greatest hits album to be released by the band. It is similar in design to other "Gold" albums released by bands either currently or previously of various labels under the Universal Music Group. The album is a 2 disc collection of both single and album tracks taken from the first 8 of the band's back catalogue.  It was released without the band's consent and had zero input from the band.

Track listing

Disc one

"Song for Whoever"
"A Little Time"
"Prettiest Eyes"
"Don't Marry Her"
"Alone"
"The Table"
"Old Red Eyes Is Back"
"Window Shopping for Blinds"
"Good as Gold (Stupid as Mud)"
"Closer Than Most"
"Baby Please Go"
"You Keep It All In"
"Dumb"
"36D"
"From Under the Covers"
"Let Love Speak Up Itself"
"Masculine Eclipse"
"Perfect 10"

Disc two
"Rotterdam (Or Anywhere)"
"Let Go with the Flow"
"Bell Bottomed Tear"
"I'll Sail This Ship Alone"
"Just a Few Things That I Ain't"
"Liars' Bar"
"Have You Ever Been Away"
"We Are Each Other"
"The Root of All Evil"
"Hit Parade"
"My Book"
"Losing Things"
"Everybody's Talkin'"
"Property Quiz"
"One Last Love Song"
"Mirror"
"One God"
"Blackbird on the Wire

The Beautiful South albums
Beautiful South
2006 greatest hits albums